USS Nevada (BB-36), the third United States Navy ship to be named after the 36th state, was the lead ship of the two s. Launched in 1914, Nevada was a leap forward in dreadnought technology; four of her new features would be included on almost every subsequent US battleship: triple gun turrets, oil in place of coal for fuel, geared steam turbines for greater range, and the "all or nothing" armor principle. These features made Nevada, alongside her sister ship , the first US Navy "standard-type" battleships.

Nevada served in both World Wars. During the last few months of World War I, Nevada was based in Bantry Bay, Ireland, to protect supply convoys that were sailing to and from Great Britain. In World War II, she was one of the battleships trapped when the Japanese attacked Pearl Harbor. Nevada was the only battleship to get underway during the attack, making the ship "the only bright spot in an otherwise dismal and depressing morning" for the United States. Still, the ship was hit by one torpedo and at least six bombs while steaming away from Battleship Row, forcing the crew to beach the stricken ship on a coral ledge. The ship continued to flood and eventually slid off the ledge and sank to the harbor floor. Nevada was subsequently salvaged and modernized at Puget Sound Navy Yard, allowing her to serve as a convoy escort in the Atlantic and as a fire-support ship in five amphibious assaults (the invasions of Attu, Normandy, Southern France, Iwo Jima, and Okinawa).

At the end of World War II, the Navy decided that, due to age, Nevada would not be retained as part of the active fleet and she was instead assigned as a target ship for the atomic experiments at Bikini Atoll in July 1946 (Operation Crossroads). The ship was hit by the blast from atomic bomb Able, and was left heavily damaged and radioactive. Unfit for further service, Nevada was decommissioned on 29 August 1946 and sunk for naval gunfire practice on 31 July 1948.

Design 

At the time of the ship's completion in 1916, The New York Times remarked that the new warship was "the greatest [battleship] afloat" because she was so much larger than other contemporary American battleships: its tonnage was nearly three times that of the obsolete 1890 pre-dreadnought , almost twice that of the 1904 battleship , and almost  greater than that of one of the first American dreadnoughts, —built just seven years prior to Nevada.

Nevada was the first battleship in the US Navy to have triple gun turrets, a single funnel, and an oil-fired steam power plant. In particular, the use of the more-efficient oil gave the ship an advantage over earlier coal-fired plants. Nevada was also the first US battleship with geared turbines, which also helped increase fuel economy and thus range compared to earlier direct drive turbines. The ability to steam great distances without refueling was a major concern of the General Board at that time. In 1903, the Board felt all American battleships should have a minimum steaming radius of  so that the US could enforce the Monroe Doctrine. One of the main purposes of the Great White Fleet, which sailed around the world in 1907–1908, was to prove to Japan that the US Navy could "carry any naval conflict into Japanese home waters". Also, oil allowed for the boiler-room crew to be reduced—the engineer on  estimated that 100 firemen (stokers) and 112 coal passers could be adequately replaced by just 24 men, which would allow some crew's quarters to be eliminated; this would save weight and also reduce the amount of fresh water and provisions that the ship would have to carry.

In addition to all of this, Nevada had maximum armor over critical areas, such as the magazines and engines, and none over less important places, even though previous battleships had armor of varying thickness depending on the importance of the area it was protecting. This radical change became known as the "all or nothing" principle, which most major navies later adopted for their own battleships. With this new armor scheme, the armor on the battleship was increased to 41.1% of the displacement.

As a result of all of these design modifications from previous battleships, Nevada was the first of the US Navy's "Standard" type battleships. "Standards" were characterized by the use of oil fuel, the "all or nothing" armor scheme, and the arrangement of the main armament in four triple or twin turrets without any turrets located in the middle of the ship. The Navy was to create a fleet of modern battleships similar in long-range gunnery, speed, turning radius, and protection. Nevada was followed by 11 other battleships of this type, although significant improvements were made in subsequent designs as naval technology rapidly progressed. An additional seven standard type battleships ( and the six of the ) were never completed due to the Washington Naval Treaty.

The two battleships of the Nevada-class were virtually identical except in their propulsion. Nevada and her sister were fitted with different engines to compare the two, putting them 'head-to-head': Oklahoma received older vertical triple expansion engines, which had proven more fuel-efficient and reliable than the direct drive turbines of some earlier battleships, while Nevada received geared Curtis steam turbines.

Construction and trials 

Nevadas construction was authorized by an Act of Congress on 4 March 1911. The contract went to Fore River Shipbuilding Company on 22 January 1912 for a total of $5,895,000 (not including the armor and armament), and the time of construction was originally to be 36 months. A secondary contract was signed on 31 July 1912 for $50,000 to cover the additional cost of a geared cruising unit on each propeller shaft; this also extended the planned construction time by five months. Her keel was laid down on 4 November 1912, and by 12 August 1914, the ship was 72.4% complete. Nevada was launched on 11 July 1914; she was sponsored by Miss Eleanor Anne Seibert, niece of Governor Tasker Oddie of Nevada and a descendant of the first Secretary of the Navy, Benjamin Stoddert. The launch was attended by several prominent members of the government, including Governor Oddie, Governor David I. Walsh of Massachusetts, Senator Key Pittman of Nevada, Secretary of the Navy Josephus Daniels and Assistant Secretary of the Navy Franklin D. Roosevelt, who would later become the 32nd President of the United States.

Nevada then had to undergo many different tests and trials prior to her commissioning to ensure that she met the terms of the original contract. The test results were positive: the oil consumption of the battlewagon was 6 lb per knot lower than the contract had demanded. After completing all of these tests and running trials off Rockland, Maine, Nevada sailed to the Boston and New York Navy Yards for equipment, torpedo tubes, and ammunition hoists. When all of the preliminaries were completed, Nevada was commissioned on 11 March 1916 at the Charlestown Navy Yard, and William S. Sims was the first captain of the new ship, followed by Joseph Strauss on 30 December 1916.

World War I 

After fitting out in the Boston and New York Navy Yards, Nevada joined the Atlantic Fleet in Newport, Rhode Island on 26 May 1916. Prior to the United States' entry into World War I, she conducted many training cruises and underwent many exercises out of her base in Norfolk, Virginia, sailing as far south as the Caribbean on these cruises. The US entered the war in April 1917, but Nevada was not sent to the other side of the Atlantic because of a shortage of fuel oil in Britain. Instead, four coal-fired battleships of Battleship Division 9 (BatDiv 9) (and ) departed the US to join the British Grand Fleet on 25 November 1917. They arrived on 7 December and were designated as the 6th Battle Squadron of the Grand Fleet.  joined them after damage from a grounding on Block Island was repaired; she departed on 30 January and arrived in Scotland on 11 February. It was not until 13 August 1918 that Nevada, then under command of Andrew T. Long , left the US for Britain, becoming the last American ship to join the Fleet overseas.

After a 10-day voyage, she arrived in Berehaven, Ireland, on 23 August. For the rest of the war, the three ships operated from the bay, escorting the large and valuable convoys bound for the British Isles to ensure no German heavy surface ships could slip past the British Grand Fleet and annihilate the merchant ships and their weak escorts of older cruisers. This never came to pass, and the war ended on 11 November with Nevada, then under command of William Carey Cole , not getting a chance to engage an enemy during the war.

On 13 December, 10 battleships, including Nevada, and 28 destroyers escorted the ocean liner , with president Woodrow Wilson embarked, into Brest, France, during the last day of Wilson's journey to the country so he could attend the Paris Peace Conference. The flotilla met George Washington and her escorts (Pennsylvania and four destroyers) just off Brest and escorted them into the port. The 10 battleships sailed for home at 14:00 on the next day, 14 December. They took less than two weeks to cross the Atlantic, and arrived in New York on 26 December to parades and celebrations.

Interwar period 

Between the two World Wars, Nevada, under the successive commands of Thomas P. Magruder , followed by William Dugald MacDougall , served in both the Atlantic and Pacific Fleets. Though she had originally been equipped with 21 five-inch (127 mm)/51 cal guns to defend against enemy destroyers, this number was reduced to 12 in 1918, due to the overly wet bow and stern positions of the other nine.

Nevada, then under command of Luke McNamee , and with the battleship , represented the United States at the Peruvian Centennial Exposition in July 1921. A year later, with Douglas E. Dismukes  in command, and in company with  this time, Nevada returned to South America as an escort to the steamer Pan America with Secretary of State Charles Evans Hughes embarked; they all attended the Centennial of Brazilian Independence in Rio de Janeiro, celebrated from 5 to 11 September 1922. The New York Times later credited the crew of Nevada for bringing baseball and that sport's unique terminology to Brazil, allowing the country to "make the Yankee game an institution of their own". At the end of 1922, John M. Luby  assumed command. Three years later, then under command of David W. Todd , Nevada took part in the US Fleet's "goodwill cruise" to Australia and New Zealand, from July–September 1925. During this cruise, the ships had only limited replenishment opportunities, but they still made it to Australia and back without undue difficulty. This demonstrated to those allies and Japan that the US Navy had the ability to conduct transpacific operations and meet the Imperial Japanese Navy in their home waters, where both Japanese and American war plans expected the "decisive battle" to be fought, if it should come.

After the cruise, Nevada, with Clarence S. Kempff  commanding, put into Norfolk Navy Yard to be modernized between August 1927 and January 1930. Hilary H. Royall  took over command during this period. Work on the ship included exchange of her "basket" masts for tripod masts and her steam turbines for those from the recently stricken battleship . These were geared turbines that had been retrofitted to North Dakota in 1917, replacing her original direct drive turbines to increase her range. Nevada then served in the Pacific Fleet for the next eleven years. During this time, she was commanded by John J. Hyland , William S. Pye , Adolphus Staton , Robert L. Ghormley , Claude B. Mayo ,
Robert Alfred Theobald  and Francis W. Rockwell.

World War II

Attack on Pearl Harbor 

On 6 December 1941, a Saturday, all of the Pacific Fleet's battleships were in port for the weekend for the first time since 4 July. Normally, they took turns spending time in port: six would be out with Vice Admiral William S. Pye's battleship Task Force One one weekend, while the next weekend would find three ranging with Vice Admiral William Halsey, Jr.'s aircraft carrier task force. However, because Halsey could not afford to take the slow battleships with his fast carriers on his dash to reinforce Wake Island's Marine detachment with fighters and because it was Pye's turn to rest in port and the harbor was where it was considered safe, none of the battleships were sailing on that morning. When the sun rose over Nevada on the 7th, the ship's band was playing "Morning Colors"; but planes then appeared on the horizon and the attack on Pearl Harbor began.

Aft of Arizona during the attack, Nevada was not moored alongside another battleship off Ford Island, and therefore was able to maneuver, unlike the other seven battleships present. Commanding officer Francis W. Scanland , was ashore when the attack began. The Officer of the Deck, Ensign Joe Taussig (son of the admiral of the same name), had earlier that morning ordered a second boiler lit off, planning to switch the power load from one boiler to the other around 0800. Seconds later, the same Kate torpedo bomber that dropped the torpedo was shot down by Nevadas gunners. The torpedo bulkhead held, but leaking through joints caused flooding of port side compartments below the first platform deck between frames 30 and 43 and a list of 4–5°. Her damage control crew corrected the list by counter-flooding and Nevada got underway at 0840, her gunners already having shot down four planes. Ensign Taussig's efficiency paid off, likely saving his ship, but he lost a leg in the attack.

Nevada became a prime target for Japanese Val dive bombers during the second wave. Japanese pilots intended to sink her in the channel, ostensibly to block the harbor. Tactically target selection was wrong as 14–18 dive bombers attacking her wouldn't be able to sink a battleship with 250 kg bombs and the channel's width of 1200 feet made bottling up the harbor impossible. As she steamed past Ten-Ten Dock at about 09:50, Nevada was struck by five bombs. One exploded over the crew's galley at Frame 80. Another struck the port director platform and exploded at the base of the stack on the upper deck. Yet another hit near No. 1 turret inboard from the port waterway and blew large holes in the upper and main decks. Two struck the forecastle near Frame 15; one passed out through the side of the second deck before exploding, but the other exploded within the ship near the gasoline tank; leakage and vapors from this tank caused intense fires around the ship.

The gasoline fires that flared up around Turret 1 might have caused more critical damage if the main magazines had not been empty. For several days prior to the attack, all of the 14-inch-gun (356 mm) battleships had been replacing their standard-weight main battery projectiles with a new heavier projectile that offered greater penetration and a larger explosive charge in exchange for a slight decrease in range. All of the older projectiles and powder charges had been removed from the magazines of Nevada, and the crew had taken a break after loading the new projectiles in anticipation of loading the new powder charges on Sunday.

As bomb damage became evident, Nevada was ordered to proceed to the west side of Ford Island to prevent her from sinking in deeper water. Gasoline fires prevented damage control parties from containing flooding forward of the main torpedo defense system. Flooding the main magazine and counterflooding to keep the ship stable lowered the bow allowing water to enter the ship at the second deck level. Lack of watertight subdivision between the second and main decks from frame 30 to frame 115 allowed water entering through bomb holes in the forecastle to flow aft through the ship's ventilation system to flood the dynamo and boiler rooms.

Over the course of the morning, Nevada suffered a total of 60 killed and 109 wounded. Two more men died aboard during salvage operations on 7 February 1942 when they were overcome by hydrogen sulfide gas from decomposing paper and meat. The ship suffered a minimum of six bomb hits and one torpedo hit, but "it is possible that as many as ten bomb hits may have been received, [...] as certain damaged areas [were] of sufficient size to indicate that they were struck by more than one bomb."

Attu 

On 12 February 1942, now with Captain Harry L. Thompson  commanding, Nevada was refloated and underwent temporary repairs at Pearl Harbor so she could get to Puget Sound Navy Yard for major repairs and modernization. Then under command of Captain Howard F. Kingman , the overhaul was completed in October 1942, and it changed the old battleship's appearance so she slightly resembled a South Dakota from a distance.
 Her 5"/51s and 5"/25s were replaced with sixteen 5"/38 caliber guns in new twin mounts. Nevada, with Captain Willard A. Kitts  commanding, then sailed for Alaska, where she provided fire support from 11 to 18 May 1943 for the capture of Attu. Nevada then departed for Norfolk Navy Yard in June for further modernization.

D-Day 
After completion, in mid-1943 Nevada went on Atlantic convoy duty. Old battleships such as Nevada were attached to many convoys across the Atlantic to guard against the chance that a German capital ship might head out to sea on a raiding mission.

After completing more convoy runs, Nevada set sail for the United Kingdom to prepare for the Normandy Invasion, arriving in April 1944, with Captain Powell M. Rhea  in command. Her float plane artillery observer pilots were temporarily assigned to VOS-7 flying Spitfires from RNAS Lee-on-Solent (HMS Daedalus). 

She was chosen as Rear Admiral Morton Deyo's flagship for the operation. During the invasion, Nevada supported forces ashore from 6–17 June, and again on 25 June; during this time, she employed her guns against shore defenses on the Cherbourg Peninsula, "[seeming] to lean back as [she] hurled salvo after salvo at the shore batteries."
 Nevada was later praised for her "incredibly accurate" fire in support of beleaguered troops, as some of the targets she hit were just  from the front line. Nevada was the only battleship present at both Pearl Harbor and the Normandy landings.

Southern France 
After D-Day, the Allies headed to Toulon for another amphibious assault, codenamed Operation Dragoon. To support this, many ships were sent from the beaches of Normandy to the Mediterranean, including five battleships (the United States' Nevada, the British , and the Free French ), three US heavy cruisers (and ), and many destroyers and landing craft were transferred south.

Nevada supported this operation from 15 August to 25 September 1944, "dueling" with "Big Willie": a heavily reinforced fortress with four 340 mm (13.4 in) guns in two twin turrets. These guns had been salvaged from the French battleship Provence after the scuttling of the French fleet in Toulon; the guns had a range of nearly 19 nautical miles (35 km) and they commanded every approach to the port of Toulon. In addition, they were fortified with heavy armor plate embedded into the rocky sides of the island of Saint Mandrier. Due to these dangers, the fire-support ships assigned to the operation were ordered to level the fortress. Beginning on 19 August, and continuing on subsequent days, one or more heavy warships bombarded it in conjunction with low-level bomber strikes. On the 23rd, a bombardment force headed by Nevada struck the "most damaging" blow to the fort during a 6½ hour battle, which saw 354 salvos fired by Nevada. Toulon fell on the 25th, but the fort, though it was "coming apart at the seams", held out for three more days.

Nevada then headed to New York to have her gun barrels relined.

Iwo Jima, Okinawa and Japan 

After re-fitting, and with Captain Homer L. Grosskopf  commanding, she sailed for the Pacific, arriving off Iwo Jima on 16 February 1945 to "[prepare] the island for invasion with heavy bombardment"; which she did through 7 March. During the invasion, she moved to be within  from shore to provide maximum firepower for the troops that were advancing.

On 24 March 1945, Nevada joined Task Force 54 (TF 54), the "Fire Support Force", off Okinawa as bombardment began prior to the invasion of Okinawa. The ships of TF 54 then moved into position on the night of the 23rd, beginning their bombardment missions at dawn on the 24th. Along with the rest of the force, Nevada shelled Japanese airfields, shore defenses, supply dumps, and troop concentrations. However, after the fire support ships retired for the night, dawn "came up like thunder" when seven kamikazes attacked the force while it was without air cover. One plane, though hit repeatedly by antiaircraft fire from the force, crashed onto the main deck of Nevada, next to turret No. 3. It killed 11 and wounded 49; it also knocked out both  guns in that turret and three 20 mm anti-aircraft weapons. Another two men were lost to fire from a shore battery on 5 April. Until 30 June, she was stationed off Okinawa; she then departed to join the 3rd Fleet from 10 July to 7 August, which allowed Nevada to come within range of the Japanese home islands during the closing days of the war, though she did not bombard them.

Post-war 

Nevada, then with her final commanding officer, Captain Cecil C. Adell , returned to Pearl Harbor after a brief stint of occupation duty in Tokyo Bay. Nevada was surveyed and, at 32⅓ years old, was deemed too old to be kept in the post-war fleet. As a result, she was assigned to be a target ship in the first Bikini atomic experiments (Operation Crossroads) of July 1946. The experiment consisted of detonating two atomic bombs to test their effectiveness against ships. Nevada was the bombardier's target for the first test, codenamed 'Able', which used an air-dropped weapon. To help distinguish the target from surrounding vessels, Nevada was painted a reddish-orange. Due in part to the miss, Nevada survived. Nevada was later towed to Pearl Harbor and decommissioned on 29 August 1946.

After she was thoroughly examined,  and two other vessels used Nevada as a practice gunnery target 65 miles southwest of Pearl Harbor on 31 July 1948. The ships did not sink Nevada, so she was given a coup de grâce with an aerial torpedo hit amidships.

Legacy 

 One of the former Arizona guns mounted on Nevada is paired with a gun formerly on Missouri at the Wesley Bolin Memorial Plaza just east of the Arizona State Capitol complex in downtown Phoenix, Arizona. It is part of a memorial representing the start and end of the Pacific War for the United States.

Wreck 

On 11 May 2020, it was announced that a joint expedition by Ocean Infinity, with its ship the Pacific Constructor, and the operations center of SEARCH Inc., headed by Dr. James Delgado had discovered Nevadas wreck. The wreck lies upside down, with the main hull carrying the scars of shell fire and torpedo hits. Nearby is a large debris field with the turrets, which fell off the ship as she capsized, and the bow and stern, both of which were torn free. Archaeologists also documented the two tripod masts, portions of the bridge, sections of deck and superstructure, and one of four tanks, an M26 Pershing, placed on the deck for the atomic bomb tests. The hull was still painted and the number "36" was visible on the stern.

 See also 

 Battleship Row

 Notes 

 References 

 Bibliography Print sources 
 
 
 
 
 
 
 
 
 
 
 
 
 
 
 
 
 
 
 
 
 
 
 
 
 
 
 
 
 
 
 
 Online sources 
 
 
 
 
 
 
 
 
 
 
 
 
 
 
 
 
 The New York Times'''''

Further reading

External links 

  – 1912–1919
 Navy photos of Nevada (BB-36)
 Navy photos of Nevada during the Pearl Harbor attack 
 MaritimeQuest USS Nevada BB-36 Photo Gallery
 Nevada Damage Report following the Pearl Harbor Attack
 Citations of articles, books, and websites about USS Nevada from ShipIndex.org
 Overview of "Operation Crossroads"
 USS Nevada Collection at the Nevada State Museum

 

Naval ships of Operation Neptune
Nevada-class battleships
Ships built in Quincy, Massachusetts
1914 ships
World War I battleships of the United States
World War II battleships of the United States
Ships present during the attack on Pearl Harbor
Maritime incidents in December 1941
Ships of the Aleutian Islands campaign
Ships sunk as targets
Ships involved in Operation Crossroads
Maritime incidents in 1946
Maritime incidents in 1948